Al-Salmani is a Basic People's Congress administrative division of Benghazi, Libya. It is part of the city of Benghazi, being east of the port and just north of Raas Abayda.

References

Basic People's Congress divisions of Benghazi